is a former Japanese football player.

Playing career
Okitsu was born in Hyogo Prefecture on June 15, 1974. After graduating from University of Tsukuba, he joined J1 League club Shimizu S-Pulse in 1997. He played many matches as forward in 1997. However he could hardly play in the match from 1998. In 2000, he moved to Cerezo Osaka. He played as midfielder in 2000 and retired end of 2000 season.

Club statistics

References

External links

1974 births
Living people
University of Tsukuba alumni
Association football people from Hyōgo Prefecture
Japanese footballers
J1 League players
Shimizu S-Pulse players
Cerezo Osaka players
Association football midfielders